Colphepeira is a genus of North American orb-weaver spiders containing the single species, Colphepeira catawba. It was first described by Allan Frost Archer in 1941, and has only been found in United States and Mexico.

References

Araneidae
Monotypic Araneomorphae genera
Spiders of Mexico
Spiders of the United States